The La Rioja tournament is the previous round of the Copa RFEF in La Rioja. Organized by the Football Federation of La Rioja, the Regional teams in Segunda División B and the best teams of the Tercera División (Group 3) not qualified to the Copa del Rey play this tournament, including farm teams.

It is usually played between July and October, and the champion of the tournament qualifies to the National tournament of the Copa RFEF.

Format
The Cup has been played since 2004, when the Riojan group split from Navarre. Played by the teams that did not qualify to Copa del Rey, the format depends on the number of registered teams.

The winner receives a €3,000 prize. The final game is always played at Estadio Mundial 82 in Logroño.

History

Champions

References

External links
Football Federation of La Rioja

Football in La Rioja (Spain)
Rioja